The 2010 SMU Mustangs football team represented Southern Methodist University in the 2010 NCAA Division I FBS football season. The Mustangs, led by third-year head coach June Jones, were members of Conference USA in the West Division and played their home games at Gerald J. Ford Stadium.

For the first time since the 1980s, the SMU Mustangs received a ranking point in both the pre-season AP Poll and the pre-season Coaches Poll

They finished the season 7–7, 6–2 in C-USA play and were co-champions of the west division with Tulsa. Due to their victory over Tulsa, the Mustangs represented the division in the 2010 Conference USA Championship Game where they were defeated by UCF 7–17. They were invited to the Armed Forces Bowl in their home stadium where they were defeated by Army 14–16.

Schedule

Denotes the largest crowd to watch a football game at Gerald J. Ford Stadium. This breaks the record set in 2004 when the Mustangs hosted the Texas Tech Red Raiders.
Denotes the largest crowd to watch a football game at Gerald J. Ford Stadium, breaking the previous mark set earlier in the season.

Game summaries

Texas Tech

This game was the 48th meeting of the SMU Mustangs and the Texas Tech Red Raiders. The previous match-up was September 13, 2008, a game in which Texas Tech defeated SMU with a final score of 43–7. After the Mustangs lost in Lubbock, Texas Tech now leads the series 32–16. For his school-record 61 yard field goal, Matt Szymanski was named Conference USA Special Teams Player of the week.

UAB

This game will mark the 4th meeting of the SMU Mustangs and the UAB Blazers. They last met in the previous season on September 12, 2009, where SMU defeated UAB with a final score of 35 – 33. After the game, SMU now leads the series 4 – 0.

Washington State

This game will mark the 2nd meeting of the SMU Mustangs and the Washington State Cougars. They last met in the previous season on September 19, 2009, where Washington State defeated SMU with a final score of 30 – 27. After the 2010 meeting, the series stands at 1 – 1. It was the first win for the Mustangs against a school from a BCS conference since they defeated Kansas 31-17 on September 2, 2000.

TCU

This game will mark the 89th meeting of the SMU Mustangs and the TCU Horned Frogs. They last met in the previous season on October 3, 2009, where TCU defeated SMU with a final score of 39 – 14. After the 2010 meeting, TCU leads the series 43 – 39 – 7. The two teams have a storied cross-town rivalry and will contend for the Iron Skillet trophy in the Battle for the Iron Skillet.

Rice

This game will mark the 88th meeting of the SMU Mustangs and the Rice Owls. They last met in the previous season on November 7, 2009, where SMU defeated Rice with a final score of 31 – 28. After the 2010 meeting, SMU now leads the series 47 – 40 – 1. The two teams have a storied cross-state rivalry and will contend for the Mayor's Cup trophy in the Battle for the Mayor's Cup. It was SMU's first win in Rice Stadium since 1986 before SMU received the Death Penalty for the 1987–88 seasons. Quarterback Kyle Padron was named Conference USA Offensive Player of the Week for his performance in the game which included three touchdowns, zero interceptions and 371 total yards.

Tulsa

This game will mark the 18th meeting of the SMU Mustangs and the Tulsa Golden Hurricane. They last met in the previous season on October 31, 2009, where SMU defeated Tulsa with a final score of 27 – 13. After SMU won the 2010 matchup, SMU now leads the series 12 – 6.

Navy

This game will mark the 15th meeting of the SMU Mustangs and the Navy Midshipmen. They last met in the previous season on October 17, 2009, where Navy defeated SMU with a final score of 38 – 35. After the 2010 meeting, Navy leads the series 8 – 7. The two schools now compete for the Gansz Trophy named after Frank Gansz who played a significant role in both school's football programs.

Houston

This game will mark the 26th meeting of the SMU Mustangs and the Houston Cougars. They last met in the previous season on October 24, 2009, where Houston defeated SMU with a final score of 38 – 15. After the 2010 meeting, Houston leads the series 16 – 9 – 1.

Tulane

This game will mark the 19th meeting of the SMU Mustangs and the Tulane Green Wave. They last met in the previous season on November 28, 2009, where SMU defeated Tulane with a final score of 26 – 21. After the 2010 meeting, Tulane leads the series 12 – 7.

UTEP

This game will mark the 18th meeting of the SMU Mustangs and the UTEP Miners. They last met in the previous season on November 14, 2009, where SMU defeated UTEP with a final score of 35 – 31. After losing 14-28, SMU leads the series 10 – 8.

Marshall

This game will mark the 4th meeting of the SMU Mustangs and the Marshall Thundering Herd. They last met in the previous season on November 21, 2009, where Marshall defeated SMU with a final score of 34 – 31. After SMU won the 2010 match 31-17, the series is tied 2 – 2.

East Carolina

This game will mark the 4th meeting of the SMU Mustangs and the East Carolina Pirates. They last met in the previous season on October 10, 2009, where SMU defeated East Carolina with a final score of 28 – 21. After SMU's 45-38 victory, the series is now tied at 2 – 2.

UCF–Conference USA Football Championship Game

This game will mark the 3rd meeting of the SMU Mustangs and the UCF Knights. They last met in 2008, where UCF defeated SMU with a final score of 31 – 17. The all-time series stands in UCF's favor 2-0.

Army–Armed Forces Bowl

Roster

NFL Draft
6th Round, 178th Overall Pick by the Washington Redskins—Sr. WR Aldrick Robinson

References

SMU
SMU Mustangs football seasons
SMU Mustangs football